Paladugu is a village in Guntur district of the Indian state of Andhra Pradesh. It is located in Medikonduru mandal of Guntur revenue division.

Geography 

Demographics 
Telugu is the official language, but Urdu is also spoken by large numbers of inhabitants.

Governance 

Paladugu gram panchayat is the local self-government of the village. It is divided into wards and each ward is represented by a ward member. The village forms a part of Andhra Pradesh Capital Region and is under the jurisdiction of APCRDA.

Education 

As per the school information report for the academic year 2018–19, the village has a total of 3 Zilla Parishad/MPP schools.

References 

Villages in Guntur district